American Born Chinese is an upcoming action comedy television series based on the 2006 graphic novel of the same name by Gene Luen Yang. Filming began in Los Angeles in February 2022. 

The series is set to premiere on Disney+ on May 24, 2023.

Premise
Jin Wang, struggling with his school life and home life, meets the new foreign exchange student at his school, leading him to become involved in a battle between Gods of Chinese mythology.

Cast

Main
 Michelle Yeoh as Guanyin
 Ben Wang as Jin Wang
 Yeo Yann Yann as Christine Wang
 Chin Han as Simon Wang
 Daniel Wu as Sun Wukong
 Ke Huy Quan as Freddy Wong
 Jim Liu as Wei-Chen
 Sydney Taylor as Amelia

Recurring
 Stephanie Hsu as Shiji Niangniang
 Hong Huifang as Nine-tailed fox
 Poppy Liu as Princess Iron Fan
 Ronny Chieng as an unconventional monk
 Rosalie Chiang as Suzy Nakamura
 James Hong as Jade Emperor 
 Lisa Lu as Ni Yang
 Jimmy O. Yang as Dragon King 
 Leonard Wu as Niu Mowang

Production

Development 
On October 4, 2021, it was announced that Disney+ had greenlit an adaptation of the Gene Luen Yang graphic novel and ordered it straight to series, with Destin Daniel Cretton directing and Charles Yu and Kelvin Yu writing the series. On April 28, 2022, Asian-American fashion designers Prabal Gurung and Phillip Lim joined the series to work alongside costume designer Joy Cretton to create costumes. Lucy Liu confirmed she is a director on the series.

Casting
In February 2022, it was reported that Michelle Yeoh, Ben Wang, Yeo Yann Yann, Chin Han, Daniel Wu, Ke Huy Quan, Jim Liu, and Sydney Taylor were cast in starring roles. Stephanie Hsu joined the cast of the series in May, playing Shiji Niangniang, with Poppy Liu added in June. The recurring cast, including Hsu and Liu, was announced in February 2023.

Filming
Principal photography began in Los Angeles on February 8, 2022 and wrapped on July 6, 2022.

Release
American Born Chinese had its world premiere at South by Southwest on March 15, 2023. It is scheduled to premiere on Disney+ on May 24, 2023.

The series received criticism for appearing to change a key character's nationality from Taiwanese to Chinese.

References

External links

Chinese American television
English-language television shows
Works by Destin Daniel Cretton
Upcoming comedy television series
Disney+ original programming
American action comedy television series
Television shows filmed in Los Angeles
Television shows based on comics
Television series by 20th Century Fox Television
Television shows based on Journey to the West